Firenza may refer to:

 Oldsmobile Firenza, a 1982–1988 American compact car
 Vauxhall Firenza, a 1970–1975 British compact car
 Peavey Firenza, an electric guitar; see List of Peavey guitars#Guitars

See also
 Florence, Tuscany, Italy, a city (more properly, Firenze)